Farz is a Pakistani television series first broadcast on PTV Home in 2017, directed by Kashif Nisar and written by Amir Raza. The series stars Sonia Mishal as an honest young police officer in lead role while Nauman Ejaz, Aamna Malick, Azra Aftab, Qavi Khan and Saleem Mairaj in supporting roles.

Cast 
 Sonia Mishal as Aliya
 Nauman Ijaz as Cheif Malik
 Qavi Khan as Bhai Sahab
 Saleem Mairaj as Saleem
 Inayat Khan as Khurram
 Aamna Malick as Mehak
 Azra Aftab as Aliya's mother
 Kinza Malik as Mehak's mother
 Talha Chahour as Imran
 Iftikhar Iffi 
 Umer Darr

References 

Pakistani drama television series
Urdu-language television shows
Pakistan Television Corporation original programming